Kupeantha is a genus of flowering plants in the family Rubiaceae. It is found in Cameroon and Equatorial Guinea. The genus is closely related to Argocoffeopsis and Calycosiphonia.

Species
Kupeantha ebo 
Kupeantha fosimondi 
Kupeantha kupensis 
Kupeantha pentamera 
Kupeantha spathulata 
Kupeantha yabassi

References

Rubiaceae
Rubiaceae genera
Taxa named by Martin Cheek